Quakenbrück (Northern Low Saxon: Quokenbrügge) is a town in the district of Osnabrück, in Lower Saxony, Germany. It is situated on the river Hase. It is part of the Samtgemeinde ("collective municipality") of Artland.

History

Quakenbrück was founded in 1234 by the Bishop of Osnabrück, according to the earliest documents, although the area had been settled previously. It served as a border to the north of Osnabrück.

On 29 May 1916, a nail man made from French poplar was given to the town by Clemens Freiherr von Schorlemer-Lieser and placed in the meeting room of the town hall. Revenue from the statue, which depicted a 13th-14th-century knight clad in armor and holding a shield and a sword and has come to be known as the Quakenbrück iron Knight (Quakenbrücker Eiserner Burgmann), were used to fuel the war effort. The statue was built by two soldiers from Schorlemer's Battalion.

Climate
Temperate coastal climate is affected by damp NW winds from the North Sea.

Sport
Quakenbrück has a professional basketball team, the Artland Dragons.

Mayors
 till 1968: Aloys Geers (SPD)
 1968–1972: Karl Möller (CDU)
 1972–1979: Horst Magnus (CDU)
 1979–1988: Werner Korfhage (FDP)
 1988–1991: Jürgen Gadeberg (SPD)
 1991–2000: Klaus Alves (CDU)
 2000–2011: Wolfgang Becker (CDU)
 2011–2014: Claus Peter Poppe (SPD)
 2014–2016: Paul Gärtner (SPD)
 2016–2017: Matthias Brüggemann (CDU)
 Since 2017: Claus Peter Poppe

Twin towns – sister cities

Quakenbrück is twinned with:
 Alençon, France
 Conway, United States
 Dobre Miasto, Poland
 Wesenberg, Germany

Notable people
Dietrich Hermann Hegewisch (1746–1812), historian
Heinrich Beythien (1873–1952), economist and politician
Wilhelm Martin (1876–1954), German-Dutch art historian
Gustav Engel (1893–1989), historian
Enno Patalas (1929–2018), film historian and critic
Helmut Berding (1930–2019), historian
Ulrike Rodust (born 1949), politician (SPD)
Justus Haucap (born 1969), economist, professor at University of Düsseldorf
Christian Brand (born 1972), football player and manager
Cinta Laura (born 1993), Indonesian actress

Associated with the town
Wilhelm Bendow (1884–1950), actor, was 1905/06 pupil of the Realgymnasium
Holger Czukay (1938–2017), musician, was a music teacher at the Artland-Gymnasium in Quakenbrück
Friedrich Ebert (1871–1925), politician (SPD), worked in the spring of 1891 in Quakenbrück in a saddlery
Klaus von Klitzing (born 1943), Nobel laureate for physics, left his Abitur in Quakenbrück in 1962, a street is named after him
Andreas Maurer (born 1970), local politician convicted of electoral fraud, member of the town council 2006–2019
Claus Peter Poppe (born 1948), politician and member of the Lower Saxony Landtag, headmaster of the Artland-Gymnasium in Quakenbrück in 1995–2003
Hans-Gert Pöttering (born 1945), politician (CDU), president of the European Parliament, graduate of the Artland-Gymnasium

References

Osnabrück (district)
Members of the Hanseatic League